Alaris was the brand name of the regional rail network run by the Spanish national rail company Renfe Operadora that connected the major cities of Madrid and Valencia, and Barcelona and the main cities of the Valencian community, between 1999 and 2013. Alaris services used ETR 490 trainsets, as well as S-120 and S-130 units. It was replaced by the renewed Renfe Intercity system.

History

Midway through the 1990s, RENFE realised that needed to replace its old Talgo III trains which had run on the line for over thirty years. As a replacement, RENFE looked for new railcars that could run at high speeds on electric lines. After searching throughout the ideas of multiple companies, RENFE chose a conglomeration of GEC Alsthom and FIAT Ferroviaria as the winners of a bid to develop new trains for the network titled ETR 490, similar to the ETR 470 trains used on the Italian Cisalpino network. The new units were put into service on a new line between Madrid and Valencia via Albacete with emphasis on high speed, quality, and comfort. Although originally known as InterCity 2000, RENFE did not believe that the name was representative of the service, RENFE decided to rename the service "Alaris." RENFE then rebranded and repainted its trainsets and other publicity to show the new logo.

Starting in 2013, Alaris was gradually replaced by the renewed Renfe Intercity system.

Service quality
Alaris was a medium/high profile rail service, very similar to aeroplanes business class, with stewardess, restaurant/snack bar, press service, personal multimedia stations, free automobile parking and baby sitter services.

Criticism 
Despite its new and modern trains, higher focus on quality and speed, and modernity, Alaris was criticised. Most critics pointed to a few main details where Alaris did not meet expectations:
 Alaris only had a thirteen-minute improvement over the previous train (InterCity UT-448) that used the system.
 There were only 160 seats on the new Alaris trains, while the InterCity UT-448 trains had 206 seats available in each car. This meant that it took less time for trains to be full and passengers had to make reservations beforehand to ensure that there was a seat available for them.
 Prices for Alaris were more expensive than those of the original rail service and features such as the BonoCity (four trips between Madrid and Valencia) had ceased to exist, therefore increasing the price to use the service.

External links 

Renfe

ca:Línies de Llarga Distància a Catalunya#Alaris